László Jeney (30 May 1923 – 24 April 2006) was a Hungarian water polo player who competed in the 1948 Summer Olympics,  1952 Summer Olympics, 1956 Summer Olympics, and 1960 Summer Olympics. He is one of eight male athletes who won four or more Olympic medals in water polo.

He was born in Cluj, Kingdom of Romania and died in Budapest.

Jeney was part of the Hungarian team which won the silver medal in the 1948 tournament. He played two matches as goalkeeper.

Four years later he was a member of the Hungarian team which won the gold medal in the 1952 Olympic tournament. He played six matches as goalkeeper.

At the 1956 Games he won again the gold medal with the Hungarian team. He played two matches as goalkeeper.

His last Olympic tournament was in Rome 1960 where he won the bronze medal. Again he played two matches as goalkeeper for the Hungarian team.

See also
 Hungary men's Olympic water polo team records and statistics
 List of multiple Olympic medalists in one event
 List of Olympic champions in men's water polo
 List of Olympic medalists in water polo (men)
 List of players who have appeared in multiple men's Olympic water polo tournaments
 List of men's Olympic water polo tournament goalkeepers
 Blood in the Water match

References

External links
 

1923 births
2006 deaths
Sportspeople from Cluj-Napoca
Hungarian male water polo players
Water polo goalkeepers
Water polo players at the 1948 Summer Olympics
Water polo players at the 1952 Summer Olympics
Water polo players at the 1956 Summer Olympics
Water polo players at the 1960 Summer Olympics
Olympic gold medalists for Hungary in water polo
Olympic silver medalists for Hungary in water polo
Olympic bronze medalists for Hungary in water polo
Medalists at the 1960 Summer Olympics
Medalists at the 1956 Summer Olympics
Medalists at the 1952 Summer Olympics
Medalists at the 1948 Summer Olympics
20th-century Hungarian people
21st-century Hungarian people